Damon Paul Harrison (born November 29, 1988) is a former American football defensive tackle. He played college football at William Penn University and was signed by the New York Jets as an undrafted free agent in 2012. He has also been a member of the New York Giants, Detroit Lions, Seattle Seahawks and Green Bay Packers. According to Pro Football Focus, he led the league in run-stop percentage between 2013 and 2016.

Early years
Harrison was born in New Iberia, Louisiana on November 29, 1988. He attended Lake Charles Boston High School, where he primarily played shooting guard on the school's basketball varsity team. On November 29, 2005, during his junior season, he injured the meniscus in his left knee, and gained "like 40 or 50 pounds" over the next two months. He decided to take on football for his senior year, playing both offensive and defensive line, and was an all-district and all-Southwest Louisiana selection in 2006. He was also named as the team captain and was selected as Lake Charles Boston's Offensive MVP and Defensive MVP along with being selected as the Lake Charles Boston's Offensive Lineman of the Year.

Since much of recruiting takes place during a high school player's junior season, Harrison was overlooked by college scouts and wound up without any scholarship offer after his graduation. He enrolled at Northwest Mississippi Community College, but dropped out after the first semester to work as a night stocker at Walmart in Lake Charles. However, he was later recruited to William Penn University, in Oskaloosa, Iowa, by former NMCC assistant coach Steve Miller.

College career
In his first year at William Penn, Harrison finished fifth on the team in tackles. As a sophomore and junior, he was voted second-team all-conference. During his senior season, he was recognized as NAIA All-American and first-team all-conference after posting 3.5 sacks and 8.5 tackles for losses among his team-high 60 tackles. Throughout his college career, he started all 44 games he played at William Penn.

Professional career
Prior to the draft, Harrison worked out at Iowa State's pro day, and was "considered a late-round prospect in a weak class of nose tackle." The last player to have been selected from William Penn in the NFL Draft was Andy Stokes in 2005, who was taken by the New England Patriots with the final pick, and their last player to appear in an NFL game was Warren Loving in 1987.

After receiving a seventh-round grade by Jeff Bauer, Jets' director of college scouting, Harrison went undrafted in the 2012 NFL Draft. Right after the draft, he was called by twelve NFL teams to join their practice camp squads.

New York Jets
Harrison was signed by the New York Jets as an undrafted free agent on April 29, 2012. He appeared in 5 games in 2012 but did not record a single stat that year. Following the departure of Sione Pouha and a preseason injury to Kenrick Ellis, Harrison was named the starting defensive tackle for the 2013 season. On October 20, 2013, Harrison recorded his first career sack when he brought down New England Patriots quarterback Tom Brady. During the 2013 season, Harrison started all 16 games making 66 tackles, 2 passes defended, and 1 sack. In 2014, Harrison again started all 16 games with 55 tackles. In 2015, Harrison again started all 16 games making 72 tackles, 0.5 sacks, and a forced fumble.

New York Giants
Harrison signed with the New York Giants on March 9, 2016, to a 5-year contract worth $9.25 million per year with $24 million guaranteed and $30 million over the first three years. With the Giants, Harrison was selected to be in the first-team All-Pro by the Associated Press on January 6, 2017. He was also ranked 96th on the NFL Top 100 Players of 2017.

Detroit Lions
On October 24, 2018, Harrison was traded to the Detroit Lions for a conditional 2019 fifth-round draft pick. The condition was that the Lions would give either their own 2019 5th round pick or the 5th round pick that was previously acquired from the San Francisco 49ers in a trade for Laken Tomlinson, depending on which is higher. Because he was traded to the Lions before the Giants bye week and after the Lions bye week, Harrison played in 17 games during the 2018 season, the first defensive lineman to accomplish this feat.

On August 21, 2019, Harrison signed a one-year, $11 million contract extension with the Lions, keeping him under contract through the 2021 season.

On February 21, 2020, Harrison was released by the Lions.

Seattle Seahawks
On October 7, 2020, Harrison was signed to the Seattle Seahawks practice squad. He was elevated to the active roster on November 14 and 19 for the team's weeks 10 and 11 games against the Los Angeles Rams and Arizona Cardinals, and reverted to the practice squad after each game. He was promoted to the active roster on November 23. After being a healthy scratch in week 16 against the Los Angeles Rams, Harrison requested to be released and the team waived him on December 28, 2020.

Green Bay Packers
On December 30, 2020, Harrison was claimed off waivers by the Green Bay Packers.

Retirement
On November 13, 2021, Harrison announced his retirement from the NFL after nine seasons.

NFL career statistics

Regular season

Postseason

Personal life
Harrison is married to Alexis Harrison. They have seven children. He has been a resident of Washington Township, Bergen County, New Jersey.

He goes by the nickname "Snacks".

References

External links
Green Bay Packers bio
New York Jets bio
William Penn bio

1988 births
Living people
American football defensive tackles
New York Jets players
New York Giants players
Detroit Lions players
Green Bay Packers players
People from New Iberia, Louisiana
People from Washington Township, Bergen County, New Jersey
Players of American football from Louisiana
Seattle Seahawks players
Sportspeople from Lake Charles, Louisiana
William Penn Statesmen football players